Kari Øyre Slind (born 22 October 1991) is a Norwegian cross-country skier who represents Oppdal IL. She is the younger sister of the twin sisters Astrid Øyre Slind and Silje Øyre Slind, who are also cross-country skiers.

Career
In 2008, she won gold in the 5 km in the Norwegian junior national championships, in the time 12.18.8. That same year she won bronze at the Spar Cup in cross-country, in the K17 class.

In March 2010 she participated in the 2010 Norwegian junior ski championships, and was fifth in the 15 km classic and 2nd in the 5 km freestyle. In addition she received gold in the 4 × 3,75 km relay together with Anne Kjersti Kalvå, Silje Dahl Benum and Valentine Aagaard on the South Trøndelag first team. That same year she made her debut as well in the World Cup, the sprint in Drammen.

At 2010 Junior World Championships, she won bronze in the sprint and gold in the relay together with Heidi Weng, Tuva Toft Dahl and Ingvild Flugstad Østberg. In January 2011, she participated in the Junior World Championships in Estonia, and this time won silver in the 5 km free technique and in the classic sprint. Norway also won gold in the 4 × 3.3 km relay where she went along with Ragnhild Haga, Martine Ek Hagen and Heidi Weng. In addition, she came in sixth place in the pursuit.

She was part of Oppdal's relay team at the 2012 Norwegian nationals, where they came in fourth place in the 3 × 5 km relay. The following year, at Norway Cup skiing in 2013 in January, she got bronze in the 3 × 5 km relay. She was also selected for the U23 World Ski Championships in 2013, where she won the bronze in the 15 km Skiathlon behind Ragnhild Haga and Debora Agreiter.

In the 2015 Norwegian nationals she won the 3 × 5 km relay with the Oppdal team of all three Øyre Slinde sisters. In addition, she was fifth place in the free technique team sprint and sixth place in the 30 km classic.

The 2015-16 season was Slind's first full season with the Norwegian national season on the world cup. She achieved her world cup personal bests by placing fifth in the Davos 15 km freestyle race on December 12, 2015 and also fifth in the 10 km freestyle stage of Ski Tour Canada on March 11, 2015.

Cross-country skiing results
All results are sourced from the International Ski Federation (FIS).

World Cup

Season standings

References

External links
 Norwegian Ski Federation -  Kari Øyre SLINDE 

1991 births
Living people
People from Oppdal
Norwegian female cross-country skiers
Tour de Ski skiers
Sportspeople from Trøndelag